Pongsaklek Wonjongkam (born: 11 August 1977) is a former Thai professional boxer and current boxing trainer. He is a two-time former lineal flyweight champion. During his first reign as world flyweight champion, which lasted between 2001 to 2007, Wonjongkam defended his title 17 times against 16 fighters, with both numbers being a flyweight record.

Professional career 
Wonjongkam had a record of 9-2 early in his career. Both losses were to Filipino journeyman Jerry Pahayahay, whom Wonjongkam would defeat by 10-round decision in February 1998. Since his second loss on July 11, 1996 to July 18, 2007, Wonjongkam won 55 consecutive bouts, the longest continuous win streak in boxing at the time.

On March 28, 1997 Wonjongkam knocked out Mzukisi Sikali of South Africa in 48 seconds to win the WBU Light Flyweight Championship. Sikali would go on to hold both the IBO Flyweight and WBU Super Flyweight titles.

WBC Flyweight Champion 
On March 2, 2001, Wonjongkam fought Malcolm Tuñacao for the WBC and Lineal Flyweight Championships. Tuñacao won the Flyweight Lineage Championship from Medgoen Singsurat, who won the title by knocking out Manny Pacquiao. Pacquiao would later become the number one pound for pound fighter in the world. Wonjongkam won by first-round TKO after knocking Tuñacao down three times.

In his fourth Lineal and WBC Flyweight title defense, on April 19, 2002, Wonjongkam knocked out Japanese flyweight titleholder Daisuke Naito in 34 seconds. This knockout set the record for fastest knockout in division history.

On November 17, 2006, Wonjongkam defeated South African boxer Monelisi Mhikiza Myekeni by unanimous decision. Wonjongkam set the flyweight division record for consecutive title defenses, 16, with this victory. He then successfully defended his title against Tomonobu Shimizu, after Shibizu retired on his stool between the 6th and 7th rounds. Shibizu was the 16th boxer Wonjonkgam defended his title against, establishing another flyweight record.

Wonjongkam was ranked number ten in Ring magazine's pound-for-pound rankings, but Jermain Taylor bumped him off the list on June 18, 2006. Wonjongkam was ranked as The Rings number one flyweight until his loss to Daisuke Naito in 2007.

 Losing the Title 
Wonjongkam suffered a shocking upset decision loss to Daisuke Naito in July, 2007, ending his long run as champion. Wonjongkam had defeated Naito twice in previous titles defenses. On March 8, 2008, Wonjongkam faced Naito in a rematch which ended in a draw.

 Wonjongkam vs. Miranda 
Wonjongkam won the vacant Interim WBC Flyweight Championship in a bout against Mexican Julio César Miranda on April 24, 2009. The 12 round bout ended by a unanimous decision. Wonjongkam defended his interim title against Takahisa Masuda by knockout, setting the stage for a bout against Lineal WBC Flyweight Champion Koki Kameda, who had recently defeated Naito to win the title.

 Recapturing the WBC Flyweight Championship 
On March 27, 2010, Wonjongkam fought Lineal Champion, Koki Kameda, to unify the WBC Flyweight Championship and Interim WBC Flyweight Championship. The winner would also claim the vacant The Ring Flyweight Championship. Wonjongkam defeated Kameda by a 12-round majority decision to become the WBC and Ring Flyweight Champion.

 Losing the WBC Flyweight Championship 
On March 2, 2012, Wonjongkam lost his Lineal, The Ring and WBC Flyweight Titles in an upset technical knockout stoppage to Sonny Boy Jaro of Philippines. He was knocked down five times before the fight was stopped in the sixth round.

 Later career 
Wonjongkam won the vacant WBC International flyweight title against Hyobu Nakagama on August 31, 2012. However, he lost the title to Rey Megrino on November 1, 2012, by a third-round TKO, marking Wonjongkam's fifth defeat. Even more disappointingly for Wonjongkam, Megrino had a losing record of 17-20-3 going into this fight, and had been beaten twice before by Wonjongkam, first by ten-round UD in October 2007, and a first round stoppage in July 2010.

 Professional boxing record 

 Titles in boxing Major World Titles:WBC flyweight champion (112 lbs) (2x)Minor World Titles:WBU light-flyweight champion (108 lbs)Lineal Championship Titles:Lineal flyweight champion (112 lbs) (2x)The Ring'' magazine titles:The Ring flyweight champion (112 lbs)Interim titles:WBC interim flyweight champion (112 lbs)Regional/International Titles:'''
WBC International flyweight champion (112 lbs)

Other names
Pongsaklek Sitkanongsak
Pongsaklek Singwancha
Pongsaklek Kratingdaenggym
Pongsaklek Petchyindee
Pongsaklek Kaiyanghadaogym

See also
List of world flyweight boxing champions

Notes and references

External links 

 Pongsaklek Wonjongkam - BoxRec Boxing Encyclopedia
 
 Pongsaklek Wonjongkam - CBZ Profile

1977 births
Flyweight boxers
Living people
Southpaw boxers
World Boxing Council champions
World flyweight boxing champions
The Ring (magazine) champions
Pongsaklek Wonjongkam
Pongsaklek Wonjongkam